This is a list of members of the Western Australian Legislative Assembly from 2008 to 2013.

Notes
 Though Dr Liz Constable was elected as an independent, she joined Colin Barnett's Liberal government as Minister for Education on 23 September 2008. Despite this, she continued to sit in the Assembly as an independent.
 On 3 April 2009, Labor member for Fremantle and former Attorney-General Jim McGinty resigned. Greens candidate Adele Carles was elected to replace him at the by-election for Fremantle on 16 May 2009.
 On 20 July 2009, Vince Catania, the member for North West, left the Labor Party and joined the Nationals.
 On 2 October 2009, Labor member for Willagee and former Premier Alan Carpenter resigned. Labor candidate Peter Tinley was elected to replace him at the by-election for Willagee on 28 November 2009.
 On 6 May 2010, Adele Carles, the member for Fremantle, left the Greens to serve out her term as an Independent.
 On 19 July 2010, Labor member for Armadale Alannah MacTiernan resigned to run for the federal seat of Canning. Labor candidate Tony Buti was elected to replace her at the by-election for Armadale on 2 October 2010.

Members of Western Australian parliaments by term